Freeport is the county seat and largest city of Stephenson County, Illinois, United States. The population was 23,973 at the 2020 census, and the mayor of Freeport is Jodi Miller, elected in 2017. Freeport is known for hosting the second Lincoln-Douglas debate of 1858, and as "Pretzel City, USA", due to a popular local German bakery that became well known for its prolific pretzel production after it opened in 1869. Freeport High School's mascot is the Pretzel to honor its heritage.

History
The community was originally called Winneshiek. When it was incorporated, the new municipality took its name from the generosity of Tutty Baker, who was credited with running a "free port" on the Pecatonica River. The name "Winneshiek" was later adopted, and is preserved to this day, by the Freeport Community Theatre Group.

In 1837, Stephenson County was formed and Freeport became its seat of government in 1838. Linked by a stagecoach with Chicago, the community grew rapidly. In 1840, a frame courthouse was erected and the first school was founded. Within two years, Freeport had two newspapers and in 1853, the two were joined by a third which published in German. By then, the community had a population of 2,000.

On August 27, 1858, the second debate between Abraham Lincoln and Stephen A. Douglas took place in Freeport and gave the nation direction in the following years. Although Stephen Douglas won the election and retained his U.S. Senate seat, his reply to a question on slavery alienated the South, which called it the "Freeport Heresy", and split the Democratic Party. This enabled Abraham Lincoln to win the Presidency in 1860.

A monument to the debate was dedicated in 1903 by President Theodore Roosevelt and stands at this site. A life size statue recreating the event was dedicated in 1992. Another renowned statue, Lincoln the Debator by Leonard Crunelle, is a focal point in the city's Taylor Park. In many years there is also a reenactment of the debate, which has been shown on C-SPAN.

Freeport is known as the "Pretzel City", and its public high school's team is named the Pretzels.  The nickname is a reminder of Freeport's ethnic heritage; in the late 1850s, many Germans, both from Pennsylvania and from their European homeland, resettled in Stephenson County bringing with them their love of pretzel snacks. In 1869, a German immigrant named John Billerbeck established the Billerbeck Bakery, which distributed so many pretzels to residents that the local newspaper later dubbed Freeport the "Pretzel City". The city later capitalized on this nickname in 2003 by starting Freeport's first Pretzel Festival.

Before February 1893, a large square of land was purchased from the former Keller-Wittbecker farm in East Freeport. Some of this land had been subdivided and platted as the "Arcade Addition", as Arcade Manufacturing used some of that square of land in 1893 to rebuild its factory after a fire in its original location had destroyed everything. The Arcade Manufacturing Company had been in operation since 1885 when the previous Novelty Iron Works had gone out of business at the corner of Chicago and Jackson streets. That earlier company began as early as 1868. After the 1892 fire, the Arcade Manufacturing Company built an entirely new factory in the Arcade Addition of East Freeport, where they produced coffee mills and other metal products.

Freeport is home to the oldest Carnegie Library in Illinois and one of the first Carnegie Libraries designed by the Chicago architectural firm of Patton and Miller. It was renovated into Freeport's City Hall and City offices were moved to Carnegie City Hall in February 2017.

The City of Freeport transitioned to the City Manager Form of Government in May 2017.

Geography

U.S. Route 20 is a four-lane divided highway that skirts the community's northern edge. At Rockford, it links with Interstates 90 and 39, giving Freeport residents access to the entire Interstate system. I-90 is the major route between Boston and Seattle. I-39 extends from Rockford to Bloomington, where it links with I-74 and I-55. From Freeport, U.S. 20 continues west to Galena, and the metropolitan area of Dubuque, Iowa.

The area code for Freeport is 815 with an overlay area code of 779 .

Climate and flooding
The Pecatonica River has flooded Freeport seven times since May 2017. The necessary flood cleanup has cost the city more than $1.5 million.

The frequency of severe weather events appears to be increasing. According to the State Climatologist, "the number of days Freeport has experienced heavy rainfall has steadily increased every decade since 1949." The city is seeking funding to buy out homes in flood-prone neighborhoods. One study estimates that for "every $1 communities like Freeport spend to relocate their residents they will save $6 in future clean ups."

Demographics

2020 census
As of the census of 2020, the population was 23,973. The racial makeup of the city was 68.9% White, 17.9% Black or African American, 1.0% Asian, 0.4% Native American, 2.9% from other races, and 8.8% from two or more races. Ethnically, the population was 7.1% Hispanic or Latino of any race.

2000 census
As of the census of 2000, there were 26,443 people, 11,222 households, and 6,845 families residing in the city. The racial makeup of the city was 81.77% White, 13.81% African American, 0.19% Native American, 0.97% Asian, 0.04% Pacific Islander, 1.00% from other races, and 2.22% from two or more races. Hispanic or Latino of any race were 2.12% of the population.

There were 11,222 households, out of which 28.4% had children under the age of 18 living with them, 45.1% were married couples living together, 12.6% had a female householder with no husband present, and 39.0% were non-families. 33.7% of all households were made up of individuals, and 15.1% had someone living alone who was 65 years of age or older. The average household size was 2.29 and the average family size was 2.93.

In the city, the population was spread out, with 24.5% under the age of 18, 8.5% from 18 to 24, 27.8% from 25 to 44, 21.2% from 45 to 64, and 18.1% who were 65 years of age or older. The median age was 38 years. For every 100 females, there were 87.1 males. For every 100 females age 18 and over, there were 83.8 males.

The median income for a household in the city was $35,399, and the median income for a family was $43,787. Males had a median income of $35,870 versus $25,095 for females. The per capita income for the city was $18,680. About 9.9% of families and 13.1% of the population were below the poverty line, including 18.6% of those under age 18 and 9.5% of those age 65 or over.

Economy

Tourism
Tourist sites in the area include the Don Opel Arboretum, a botanical garden with over 3,000 different species of ground coverings, trees and shrubs. The Stephenson County Historical Society Museum includes Oscar Taylor House, a one-room schoolhouse, the Industrial/Arcade Toy Museum, an Irish homestead log cabin, and an arboretum. The Freeport Art Museum is located on N. Harlem Avenue.

Parks and recreation

 Krape Park was awarded "Outstanding Multi-use Facility" award by the Illinois Parks and Recreation Association. Heavily wooded Krape Park features a waterfall that tumbles down from a high limestone bluff. Visitors can ride paddle boats, play mini golf, disc golf, or play on one of the three playground areas.
 Read Park features the Read Park Family Aquatic Center and a skate park. One of the larger parks in Freeport, it also features a large pavilion, basketball courts, children's playground, shuffleboard courts, tennis courts, and softball fields. It is also home to Little Cubs Field, a replica of Wrigley Field in Chicago, IL.
A historic tabernacle sits on the property, doubling as an auditorium. It is currently being restored. 
 Taylor Park, a  park acquired in 1911, features three lighted softball fields, concession stand, basketball courts, picnic shelter and Abraham Lincoln statue. This statue, located in the southwest section of the park, was sculpted in 1928–29 by Leonard Crunelle. Its dedication on August 27, 1929, was attended by many notable guests, and was covered by newspapers across the country.
 Bidwell Park a  park presented by the heirs of Orlando B. Bidwell, features a small shelter with restrooms, a softball field, and a playground.
 Knowlton Park, a  park presented by the descendants of Dexter A. Knowlton to mark the 100th anniversary of his arrival to Freeport, features a bronze tablet and tall black maple trees to shade benches and play equipment.
 Wilbur Park, a  park donated by local industrialist W. T. Rawleigh and named after his son (who died during World War I), was deeded over to Freeport Park District on July 13, 1948. The park features landscaped terrain and playground equipment.

Education

Public schools
 Freeport High School
 Carl Sandburg Middle School
 Freeport Middle School
 Jones-Farrar Magnet School
 Blackhawk Elementary School
 Center Elementary School
 Empire Elementary School
 Lincoln-Douglas Elementary School
 Taylor Park Elementary School

Private schools
 Immanuel Lutheran
 Aquin  Catholic Schools
 Tri-County Christian Schools
 Open Bible Learning Center

Colleges
 Highland Community College offers 68 degree and certificate programs.
 Columbia College-Freeport, located on the Highland Community College campus.

Media
Local Freeport media includes WFRL (1570 AM), WFPS Radio (92.1 FM) and The Journal Standard daily newspaper.

Notable people
 

 Joseph M. Bailey, jurist and legislator
 Dan Balz, award-winning political reporter for the Washington Post
 Ken Behring, owned the NFL's Seattle Seahawks
 Harry Boeke, Illinois state senator and businessman
 Carl Cain, 1956 Olympic basketball gold medalist, University of Iowa basketball player
 John Callahan, Major League Baseball player
 Janet H. Clark, Minnesota state legislator
 Alfred A. Cohn, author, journalist and newspaper editor, Police Commissioner, and screenwriter of the 1920s and 1930s
 A.D. Condo, cartoonist
 Richard Wayne Dirksen, organist and choirmaster
 William Eckert, Air Force general, Major League Baseball commissioner
 Calista Flockhart, actress
 James B. Goetz, Minnesota Lieutenant Governor
 Tuffy Gosewisch, Major League Baseball player
 Charles Guiteau, assassin of US President James A. Garfield
 Corky Hale, jazz musician
 Clare Winger Harris, science fiction author
 Oscar E. Heard, Illinois jurist
 Edmund Heller (1875–1939) zoologist
 Homer Hillebrand, Major League Baseball player
 Donna Jogerst, All-American Girls Professional Baseball League player
 Robert L. Johnson, founder of Black Entertainment Television (BET)
 Francis Lamb, Wisconsin State Assemblyman
 Edward E. Laughlin, Illinois State Senator and lawyer
 Gerald McClellan, middleweight boxing champion
 John Meyer, Illinois State Representative, lawyer
 Ravi Patel, film and TV actor
 Jason Pearson, Major League Baseball player
 Preston Pearson, National Football League player 
 Trisha Paytas, YouTube personality
 William Buckley Peck, physician, surgeon, and founder of the Inter-State Postgraduate Medical Association of North America
 William Thomas Rawleigh, industrialist, Illinois State Representative
 Harlan Rigney, Illinois State Representative
 Stephen A. Rigney, Illinois state representative
 William Avery Rockefeller, father of John D. Rockefeller
 Adolph Rupp, head basketball coach Freeport HS 1926-30 and Univ. of Kentucky 1930–72, for whom Rupp Arena is named.
 Manuel Seal - Grammy-award-winning producer
 Ted Snyder, songwriter
 Charles J. Stine, silent film actor
 Tiffany Thayer, author, actor, Thirteen Women
 Alice Bradford Wiles, Chicago clubwoman, lived in Freeport
Steve Luecke, mayor of South Bend, Indiana, 1997-2012

References

External links

 
Cities in Illinois
Micropolitan areas of Illinois
Cities in Stephenson County, Illinois
County seats in Illinois
Populated places established in 1838
Rockford metropolitan area, Illinois
1838 establishments in Illinois